Gornje Ležeče is a small village in the Municipality  of Divača in the Littoral region of Slovenia.

References

External links 
Gornje Ležeče on Geopedia

Populated places in the Municipality of Divača